Mark Richard Cousins (born 9 January 1987) is an English footballer who plays as a goalkeeper for Ebbsfleet United.

Career
Cousins, born in Chelmsford, Essex, is a product of the Colchester United Academy. He signed for Colchester during his final year of school after being released by Fulham. Youth team coach Micky Cook expressed uncertainty over whether to sign Cousins but asked for him to attend pre-season for assessment. Putting in an impressive performance featuring in a friendly for Barnet, Cook promptly signed Cousins on a scholarship.

First featuring on the bench for Colchester in their 2–1 away defeat to Walsall in October 2004, Cousins would later join Whitton United on work experience in October 2005 prior to making his U's debut. He had additional work experience loan spells with non-league sides Staines Town, Enfield Town and Yeading, where he made three appearances. While on loan with Yeading, Cousins faced Nottingham Forest in the FA Cup first round, with 80 league places separating the two sides. The game finished 5–0 to Forest.

Cousins had to wait until the beginning of the 2007–08 season to get his first taste of first-team action with Colchester. He was brought on as a substitute for striker Kevin Lisbie after goalkeeper Dean Gerken was sent off for bringing down Kayode Odejayi in the penalty area during Colchester's 2–2 draw with Barnsley on 18 August 2007. His first task was to save the ensuing penalty, but Brian Howard slotted the penalty away. He conceded another goal later in the game, once again scored by Howard from the penalty spot. He made just one further appearance in the 2007–08 season, replacing the injured Gerken late on in a 1–1 away draw with Bristol City on 12 January 2008.

Cousins started in three Football League Trophy games for Colchester during the 2008–09 season and played in their 1–0 home defeat to Leyton Orient in the FA Cup on 8 November 2008. Cousins finally received his chance with regular first-team football with the arrival of new manager Paul Lambert in October 2008, as he finished the season with 13 appearances in all competitions, featuring in an eight-game run in March and April 2009. Following some impressive performances, Cousins was rewarded with a new two-year contract in May 2009.

Having not played a league game for the entire 2009–10 season, Cousins earned his first extended run in the first team since the end of the 2008–09 season following an injury to first choice goalkeeper Ben Williams. He kept goal for the first ten games of the season, a run in which Colchester were undefeated, as he then was selected in The Football League's League One Team of the Week on 20 September 2010. Cousins ended the season with 16 appearances in all competitions to his name, more than his combined total from the previous three seasons.

On 27 May 2011, Cousins agreed a new two-year deal with the club, competing with Ben Williams and Carl Pentney for the 2011–12 season. During the 2011–12 pre-season, a friendly match between local rivals Colchester United and Ipswich Town was abandoned when U's midfielder Andy Bond suffered a serious head injury in a collision with Cousins, leaving Bond with concussion. Having started Colchester's first nine league games of the season, Cousins spent much of it as a back-up keeper who travelled to pomes but never made the substitutes bench. However, following Ben Williams' rejection of a new contract in July 2012 and his subsequent exit, Cousins was given the number 1 shirt ahead of the 2012–13 season.

After eight years around the first team waiting for the opportunity, Cousins was first-choice keeper at Colchester United. He made his first appearance in the number 1 shirt on 14 August 2012 as Colchester fell to a 3–0 League Cup defeat to Yeovil Town. After making 26 appearances for Colchester and with the club struggling at the lower end of League One, Cousins was gradually pushed out of the first-team picture, firstly by John Sullivan in November 2012, signed on loan from Charlton Athletic, and then by Sam Walker in January 2013, signed on loan from Chelsea. However, he was offered a fresh contract in May 2013, He signed on a one-year deal with the option of a further year on 14 June.

For the 2013–14 season, Colchester re-signed Sam Walker on loan from Chelsea on 19 July 2013 having been influential in helping the U's avoid relegation to League Two. Following the expiry of Walker's loan, Colchester signed him on a permanent basis on 20 January 2014, further keeping Cousins out of first-team action.

In June 2014, he signed for Football League Two side Dagenham & Redbridge on a two-year deal after rejecting a new contract offer from Colchester. At the end of the 2014/15 season Cousins was named runner up in player of the year awards. In June 2016 Cousins signed a new two contract after the club was relegated to the National League. During the 2016/17 season Cousins was mainly a substitute but did play in the end of season play-offs after getting back in the team. Cousins started the 2017–18 season as number one ahead of Elliot Justham. On 25 May 2018 it was announced that he would leave the club at the end of the season due to the expiration of his contract.

Cousins joined Barnet on a two-year deal in June 2018. He played 53 games for the Bees in the 2018–19 season, keeping 20 clean sheets. On 3 June 2019, Cousins joined Bromley for an undisclosed fee. He suffered a severe injury in the opening minute of Bromley's 3–1 defeat to Yeovil Town on 28 September, and made his return to action on 8 February 2020 in a 2–2 draw with Solihull Moors.

On 24 June 2022, Cousins signed for National League South club Ebbsfleet United.

Career statistics

Honours
Bromley
FA Trophy: 2021–22

References
https://www.soccerbase.com/players/player.sd?player_id=39799&season_id=153

External links

1987 births
Living people
Sportspeople from Chelmsford
English footballers
Association football goalkeepers
Colchester United F.C. players
Whitton United F.C. players
Staines Town F.C. players
Enfield Town F.C. players
Yeading F.C. players
Dagenham & Redbridge F.C. players
Barnet F.C. players
Bromley F.C. players
Ebbsfleet United F.C. players
English Football League players
Isthmian League players
Southern Football League players
National League (English football) players